The Journal of Orthopaedic Nursing is a quarterly peer-reviewed healthcare journal of orthopaedic nursing. It is published by Elsevier and contains practical and theoretical guidance for trainees and professionals including papers and comments, editorial comments, book and policy reviews, and announcements of events. The journal also provides continuing medical education content.

It is the official journal of the RCN Society of Orthopaedic and Trauma Nursing and the Canadian Orthopaedic Nurses Association. It is indexed in CINAHL and VINITI. This journal is now continued as the International Journal of Orthopaedic and Trauma Nursing by Elsevier.

See also
 Orthopaedic Nursing
 List of nursing journals

External links
 
 Journal page at publisher's website

Orthopedic nursing journals
Elsevier academic journals
Publications established in 1997
Quarterly journals
English-language journals